Dominic Jalbert (born August 2, 1989) is a Canadian ice hockey defenceman who is currently playing with the University of Ottawa in the Ontario University Athletics (OUA). Prior to his University career, Jalbert played four seasons with the Chicoutimi Saguenéens in the QMJHL.

Awards and honours
CHL Scholastic Player of the Year (2010–11)

References

External links

1989 births
Canadian ice hockey defencemen
Chicoutimi Saguenéens (QMJHL) players
Ice hockey people from Gatineau
Living people
Reading Royals players
Universiade medalists in ice hockey
Universiade bronze medalists for Canada
Competitors at the 2011 Winter Universiade